Robert Kauffman, Rob Kauffman or Bob Kauffman is the name of:

Bob Kauffman (1946–2015), American basketballer
Rob Kauffman (politician), American politician elected to the Pennsylvania House of Representatives
Rob Kauffman (businessman) (born 1964), American businessman, race team owner and sports car racing driver